Draw the Line is the fifth studio album by American hard rock band Aerosmith, released on December 9, 1977. It was recorded between June–October in an abandoned convent near New York City. The portrait of the band on the album cover was drawn by the celebrity caricaturist Al Hirschfeld.

Background
By 1977, Aerosmith had released four studio albums, the two most recentToys in the Attic (1975) and Rocks (1976)catapulting the band to stardom. However, as the band began recording its next album, Draw the Line, their excessive lifestyle, combined with constant touring and drug use, began to take its toll. "Draw the Line was untogether because we weren't a cohesive unit anymore," guitarist Joe Perry admitted in the Stephen Davis band memoir Walk This Way. "We were drug addicts dabbling in music, rather than musicians dabbling in drugs. Although the LP would sell well more than a million copies in fewer than six weeks after its release, in 2014 Perry would refer to it as "the beginning of the end" and "the decay of our artistry."

Recording and composition
According to Steven Tyler's autobiography Does the Noise In My Head Bother You, manager David Krebs suggested that the band record its next album at an estate near Armonk, New York called the Cenacle, "away from the temptation of drugs."  The plan failed miserably, however, with Tyler recalling, "Drugs can be imported, David... we have our resources. Dealers deliver!  Hiding us away in a three-hundred room former convent was a prescription for total lunacy."  Largely due to their drug consumption, both Tyler and Perry were not as involved in the writing and recording as they had been on previous albums. According to Perry:

Producer Jack Douglas, who had started producing the band with Get Your Wings in 1974, expressed similar feelings about the apathy that permeated the recording sessions:

For his part, Tyler has maintained that it was the band's lethargy, not his, that slowed his progress, because "I wasn't Patti Smith writing poetry. I write exactly to the music, and when the music ain't coming, neither were the lyrics."  However, Tyler confessed to Alan di Perna of Guitar World in April 1997, "What I specifically remember was not being present in the studio because I was so stoned.  In the past, I always had to be there and hear every note that was going downwho was playing what and were they out of tune... I just didn't care anymore."  Tyler's condition is evident in some of his lyrics, such as the line "pass me the vial and cross your fingers that it don't take time."  In the VH1 Behind the Music episode on the group Douglas states, "People were shooting, bullets were flying.  It was insane.  People, drugs and guns. You know, they don't go together," with drummer Joey Kramer adding, "I don't know if we did any of those sessions, or made any of that record, straight."  In his autobiography Rocks, Perry admits that he had misplaced a cookie tin full of demos for the band that he had prepared in his basement studio, irritating Douglas, but they were eventually found by Perry's wife Elyssa:

Relations deteriorated further when Perry presented "Bright Light Fright" to the band and they "didn't like it. I said, 'Do you want to do it or not?' They said no." Perry, who has stated the song was inspired by the Sex Pistols, sang the song himself on the LP (he had shared lead vocal duties with Tyler on "Combination" from their previous album Rocks). Of "Draw the Line", Tyler later recalled, "Joe had this lick on a six-string bass that was so definitive, the song just about wrote itself. It reached down my neck and grabbed the lyrics out of my throat." The song encompasses many of the elements Aerosmith is known for, including the strong rhythm backbeat and the back-and-forth interplay between guitarists Perry and Brad Whitford. The song slows down before building to a climax showcasing Tyler's trademark scream. The B-side of some reissue versions of "Draw the Line", "Chip Away the Stone", was not on the LP but eventually surfaced on the compilation album Gems. It was written by Richard Supa, received a fair amount of radio airplay after the release of Gems and has been played live by the band.

Kramer explained in 1997 that "Kings and Queens", the LP's second single, was a "typical session at the Cenacle. It was recorded in the chapel with the pews out, the drums on the altar. Jack was in the confessional, hitting the snare drum by himself." In his memoir, Tyler writes that the song's lyrics were inspired by a "medieval fantasy" that featured "a stoned-out rock star in his tattered satin rags lying on the ancient stone floor of a castle - slightly mad, but still capable of conjuring up a revolutionary album that would astound the ears of the ones who heard it and make the critics cringe." Jack Douglas plays the mandolin on the track, which was also used as a B-side to Aerosmith's version of the Beatles' "Come Together", released to promote the Sgt. Pepper's Lonely Hearts Club Band film and soundtrack. "Get It Up" features Karen Lawrence, singer of the band L.A. Jets, on the chorus. David Krebs later stated that he felt Tyler's lyrics on songs like "Get It Up" did not help the album's standing among Aerosmith fans: "The essence of Aerosmith had always been a positive and very macho sexuality, total unashamed, a little sleazy... They didn't want to hear lyrics like 'Get It Up,' which repeated over and over again, Can't get it up'... The negative lyrics were a big problem." "Get It Up" was released as the album's third single but failed to break into the singles chart. The song is noted for its usage of slide guitar and was played occasionally by the band during the Aerosmith Express Tour from 1977 to 1978 in support of the Draw the Line album. The band didn't have as much original material as they would like, so they recorded two blues songs: Otis Rush's "All Your Love" and Kokomo Arnold's "Milk Cow Blues". ("All Your Love" did not make Draw the Line, but would later turn up on the band's box set Pandora's Box).

Reception

Contemporary reviews were quite negative. Billy Altman of  Rolling Stone called the LP "a truly horrendous record, chaotic to the point of malfunction and with an almost impenetrably dense sound adding to the confusion." Robert Christgau considered the album the product of a band "out of gas".

Retrospective reviews are more positive. Kerrang! magazine listed the album at No. 37 among the "100 Greatest Heavy Metal Albums of All Time" for its "high energy", although it never touches heavy metal as a genre, concluding with the comment "sleaze was never so classy." According to Greg Prato of AllMusic, "the band shies away from studio experimenting and dabbling in different styles," returning "to simple, straight-ahead hard rock" and releasing "the last true studio album from Aerosmith's original lineup for nearly a decade." Another AllMusic reviewer stated that, "although some fans see Draw the Line as the beginning of a decline for Aerosmith, it still offers up some strong hard-rock tunes. One of its best moments is the title track, one of the group's most relentless rockers." In a review for Ultimate Classic Rock, Sterling Whitaker cited "Get It Up" as an example of a track that "should-have-been-great-but-not-quite," saying that it "featured important elements of the classic Aerosmith sound, but somehow didn't catch fire." Martin Popoff defined Draw the Line "complicated, murky and layered", coming across as "the serious, distressed Aerosmith album". He also wrote that despite "being ambiguously dense, uncommunicative and busy", the album showed the band reaching "new levels of musical maturity."

Draw the Line went platinum its first month of release, entering the music charts on December 24, 1977, peaking at No. 11 on the US Billboard 200, and eventually being certified 2x multi-platinum nearly a decade later. Even so, it marks the band's first slowdown in album sales of their 1970s era, after their initial rise with the albums Toys in the Attic and Rocks.

Track listing

Personnel
Aerosmith
Steven Tylerlead vocals, harmonica, piano on "Kings and Queens", backing vocals on "Bright Light Fright"
Joe Perrylead guitar; rhythm guitar on "Kings and Queens", "I Wanna Know Why", "The Hand That Feeds"; slide guitar and second solo of "Milk Cow Blues"; backing vocals, lead vocals on "Bright Light Fright"
Brad Whitfordrhythm guitar, lead guitar on "Kings and Queens", "I Wanna Know Why", "The Hand That Feeds", and first solo of "Milk Cow Blues"
Tom Hamiltonbass guitar
Joey Kramerdrums, percussion

Guest musicians
Stan Bronsteinsaxophone on "I Wanna Know Why" and "Bright Light Fright"
Scott Cushniepiano on "I Wanna Know Why", "Critical Mass", and "Kings and Queens"
Karen Lawrencebacking vocals on "Get It Up"
Jack Douglasmandolin on "Kings and Queens"
Paul Prestopinoacoustic guitar, banjo guitar on "Kings and Queens"

Production
Jack Douglas – producer and arrangements with Aerosmith
David Krebs, Steve Leber – executive producers, management, art direction
Jay Messina – engineer
David Hewitt – remote truck director
Sam Ginsberg  – assistant engineer
George Marino – mastering at Sterling Sound, New York
Al Hirschfeld – cover illustration

Charts

Certifications

References

Bibliography

External links
 

Aerosmith albums
1977 albums
Albums produced by Jack Douglas (record producer)
Albums recorded at Record Plant (New York City)
Columbia Records albums